John Jay Chapman (March 2, 1862 – November 4, 1933) was an American author.

Early life
Chapman was born in New York City on March 2, 1862. He was a son of Henry Grafton Chapman Jr. (1833–1883), a broker who became president of the New York Stock Exchange, and Eleanor Kingsland Jay (1839–1921).

His paternal grandmother, Maria Weston Chapman, was one of the leading campaigners against slavery and worked with William Lloyd Garrison on The Liberator.  His maternal grandparents were John Jay (1817–1894), the U.S. Minister to Austria-Hungary, and Eleanor Kingsland (née Field) Jay (1819–1909).  His grandfather was a son of William Jay and a grandson of Chief Justice John Jay of the United States Supreme Court.

He was educated at St. Paul's School, Concord and Harvard, and after graduating in 1884, Chapman traveled around Europe before returning to study at the Harvard Law School.

Career
He was admitted to the bar in 1888, and practiced law until 1898. Meanwhile, he had attracted attention as an essayist of unusual merit. His work is marked by originality and felicity of expression, and the opinion of many critics has placed him in the front rank of the American essayists of his day.

In 1912, on the one year anniversary of the lynching of Zachariah Walker in Coatesville, Pennsylvania, Chapman gave a speech in which he called the lynching "one of the most dreadful crimes in history" and said "our whole people are...involved in the guilt." It was published as A Nation's Responsibility.

Chapman became involved in politics and joined the City Reform Club and the Citizens' Union. He was opposed to the Tammany Hall political and business grouping, which at that time dominated New York City.  He lectured on the need for reform and edited the journal The Political Nursery (1897-1901).

Personal life
Chapman was known as a passionate romantic in his personal life as well as his writing. As a law student at Harvard, he once beat a rival for a woman's love in a fight, then felt such deep remorse that he deliberately burned off his left hand as a form of self-punishment. He would later brandish the stump as evidence of his passion.

On July 2, 1889, he married Minna Timmins (1861–1897) with whom he had three children:

 Victor Emmanuel Chapman (1890–1916), the first American aviator to die in France during World War I. After Victor's death, Chapman published a memoir of his son's early life, including his letters sent from France. The letters inspired the composer Charles Loeffler, a friend of Chapman's, to write the string quartet, Music for Four Stringed Instruments.
 John Jay Chapman, Jr. (1893–1903), who drowned at Romerbad, Austria, age 9.
 Conrad Chapman (1896–1989), who was engaged to Dorothy Daphne McBurney (1912–1997) in 1934, but married Judith Daphne Kemp (1906–1999) in England in 1937.

On April 23, 1899, Chapman married Elizabeth Astor Winthrop Chanler (1866–1937), second daughter of John Winthrop Chanler and Margaret Astor Ward of the Astor family, and sister of soldier and explorer William A. Chanler. They had one child: 

 Chanler Armstrong Chapman (1901–1982), who married Olivia James, a niece of Henry James. They divorced and in 1948, he married the former Helen Riesenfeld, a writer. After her death in 1970, he  married Dr. Ida R. Holzbert Wagman in 1972. Chanler Chapman reportedly served as a model for Eugene Henderson, the main character in Saul Bellow's 1959 novel Henderson the Rain King.

John Jay Chapman died on November 4, 1933 in Poughkeepsie, New York.  His funeral, held at Christ Church on West 71st Street, New York City, was attended by hundreds.  Elizabeth Chapman died in 1937.

Bibliography
Non-fiction
 (1898). Emerson and Other Essays.  
 (1898). Causes and Consequences.
 (1900). Practical Agitation.
 (1911). Learning and Other Essays.
 (1913). William Lloyd Garrison  [second edition, revised and enlarged, 1921].
 (1914). Deutschland Uber Alles; or, Germany Speaks.
 (1915). Notes on Religion.  
 (1915). Memories and Milestones.
 (1915). Greek Genius and Other Essays.
 (1917). Victor Chapman's Letters from France, [with memoir by John Jay Chapman].
 (1922). A Glance toward Shakespeare.
 (1924). Letters and Religion.
 (1931). Lucian, Plato and Greek Morals.
 (1932). New Horizons in American Life.

Fiction
 (1892). The Two Philosophers: A Quaint, Sad Comedy.
 (1908). Four Plays for Children.  
 (1908). The Maid's Forgiveness: A Play.  
 (1909). A Sausage from Bologna: A Comedy in Four Acts. 
 (1910). The Treason and Death of Benedict Arnold: A Play for a Greek Theater.  
 (1911). Neptune's Isle and Other Plays for Children.
 (1914). Homeric Scenes: Hector's Farewell, and The Wrath of Achilles.
 (1916). Cupid and Psyche.
 (1919). Songs and Poems.

Articles
 (1909). "The Harvard Classics and Harvard," Science, Vol. 30, No. 770 (Oct. 1, 1909), pp. 440–443.
 (1910). "Professorial Ethics," Science, Vol. XXXII, pp. 5–9.
 (1920). "A New Menace to Education," Meredith College: Quarterly Bulletin, Series 13, Nos. 1–2.

Translations
 (1927). Dante.
 (1928). Two Greek Plays.
 (1930). The Antigone of Sophocles.

Collected works
 (1957). The Selected Writings of John Jay Chapman, Jacques Barzun (Editor).
 (1970). The Collected Works of John Jay Chapman, 12 Vol., Melvin H. Bernstein (Editor).
 (1998). Unbought Spirit: A John Jay Chapman Reader, Richard Stone (Editor), (Foreword by) Jacques Barzun.

References
Notes

Sources

Further reading
 Baltzell, E. Digby (1987). The Protestant Establishment: Aristocracy & Caste in America, Yale University Press.
 Bernstein, Melvin H. (1957). The Mind of John Jay Chapman, Monthly Review Press.
 Bernstein, Melvin H. (1964). John Jay Chapman, Twayne Publishers.
 Brown, Stuart Gerry (1952). "John Jay Chapman and the Emersonian Gospel," The New England Quarterly, Vol. 25, No. 2, pp. 147–180.
 Howe, M. A. De Wolfe (1937). John Jay Chapman and his Letters, Houghton Mifflin Company.
 Paul, Sherman (1960). "The Identities of John Jay Chapman," The Journal of English and Germanic Philology, Vol. 59, No. 2, pp. 255–262.
 Peel, Robin (2005). "John Jay Chapman, 'Social Order and Restraints': The Custom of the Country (1913)." In Apart from Modernism: Edith Wharton, Politics, and Fiction Before World War I, Fairleigh Dickinson University Press, pp. 197–224.
 Wilson, Edmund (1938; 1948). The Triple Thinkers, Harcourt, Brace and Company; Oxford University Press, pp. 133–164.

External links

 
 
 
 Works by John Jay Chapman, at Hathi Trust
 Works by John Jay Chapman, at Harper's Magazine
 Absent Friends: I Could Wake Up in Nirvana and Laugh
 John Jay Chapman. Brief Life of a Neglected Critic: 1862–1933

1862 births
1933 deaths
American biographers
American male biographers
American essayists
American lawyers
American male poets
Harvard Law School alumni
St. Paul's School (New Hampshire) alumni
Writers from New York City
American male essayists
Historians from New York (state)
Livingston family
Jay family
Schuyler family
Chanler family